The Frances Kurth Sharrow House is a historic house located at 841 Park Avenue in Columbus, Wisconsin. It was added to the National Register of Historic Places on May 24, 2010.

History
The house was commissioned in 1916 by John Henry Kurth, son of the founder of Kurth Brewery. It was a wedding gift for his daughter, Frances, who soon after married Lloyd C. Sharrow, who later became Mayor of Columbus. The Sharrows would live there for the rest of their lives.

References

Houses in Columbia County, Wisconsin
Houses completed in 1917
Houses on the National Register of Historic Places in Wisconsin
Prairie School architecture in Wisconsin
Columbus, Wisconsin
National Register of Historic Places in Columbia County, Wisconsin